Conus variegatus, common name the variable cone, is a species of sea snail, a marine gastropod mollusk in the family Conidae, the cone snails and their allies.

Like all species within the genus Conus, these snails are predatory and venomous. They are capable of "stinging" humans, therefore live ones should be handled carefully or not at all.

Description
The size of the shell varies between 12 mm and 43 mm. The color of the shell is yellowish brown or chestnut-color, maculated with brown on the shoulder, The shell shows numerous fine chocolate revolving lines often broken up into spots.

Distribution
This species occurs in the Atlantic Ocean off Angola.

References

 Kiener L.C. 1844–1850. Spécies général et iconographie des coquilles vivantes. Vol. 2. Famille des Enroulées. Genre Cone (Conus, Lam.), pp. 1–379, pl. 1–111 [pp. 1–48 (1846); 49–160 (1847); 161–192 (1848); 193–240 (1849); 241-[379](assumed to be 1850); plates 4,6 (1844); 2–3, 5, 7–32, 34–36, 38, 40–50 (1845); 33, 37, 39, 51–52, 54–56, 57–68, 74–77 (1846); 1, 69–73, 78–103 (1847); 104–106 (1848); 107 (1849); 108–111 (1850)]. Paris, Rousseau & J.B. Baillière

External links

 The Conus Biodiversity website
 Cone Shells – Knights of the Sea
 

Endemic fauna of Angola
variegatus
Gastropods described in 1845